Edmund Gibson (16696 September 1748) was a British divine who served as Bishop of Lincoln and Bishop of London, jurist, and antiquary.

Early life and career
He was born in Bampton, Westmorland. In 1686 he was entered a scholar at Queen's College, Oxford.  Shortly after Thomas Tenison's elevation to the see of Canterbury in 1694 Gibson was appointed chaplain and librarian to the  archbishop, and in 1703 and 1710 respectively he became rector of Lambeth and archdeacon of Surrey.

Episcopal career
In 1716 Gibson was presented to the see of Lincoln, whence he was in 1723 translated to London. For twenty-five years he exercised influence, being consulted by Sir Robert Walpole on ecclesiastical affairs.

While a conservative in church politics, and opposed to Methodism, he was no persecutor, and indeed broke with Walpole on the Quakers' Relief Bill of 1736. He exercised oversight over the morals of his diocese; and his denunciation of the masquerades which were popular at court finally lost him the royal favour. He served as a founding governor of a charity called the Foundling Hospital. His endorsement can be seen as significant since the Foundling Hospital, created by royal charter, was the nation's first non-church initiated institution to target this sort of social ill.

Gibson died in 1748, and is buried at All Saints Church, Fulham, London.

Works

In 1692 Gibson published an edition of the Saxon Chronicle with a Latin translation, indices and notes, and later a similar translation of the Lindsey Chronicle. These were followed in 1693 by an annotated edition of the De institutione oratoria of Quintilian, and in 1695 by a translation of William Camden's Britannia, with additions and improvements, for which he recruited a team of antiquaries including Edward Lhuyd, William Lloyd and John Smith.

In the discussions which arose during the reigns of William and Anne relative to the rights and privileges of the Convocation, Gibson took a very active part, and in a series of pamphlets warmly argued for the right of the archbishop to continue or prorogue even the lower house of that assembly.

The controversy suggested to him the idea of those researches which resulted in the Codex juris ecclesiastici Anglicani, published in two volumes folio in 1713, a work which discusses more learnedly and comprehensively than any other the legal rights and duties of the English clergy, and the constitution, canons and articles of the English Church. His substantial collection of pamphlets on which his research is based are housed at Lambeth Palace Library (where he began his clerical career as Librarian), as part of the Sion College Collection.

Among the literary efforts of his later years the principal were a series of Pastoral Letters in defence of the gospel revelation, against lukewarmness and enthusiasm, and on various topics of the day; also the Preservative against Popery, in 3 vols. folio (1738), a compilation of numerous controversial writings of eminent Anglican divines, dating chiefly from the period of James II.

A second edition of the Codex juris, revised and improved, with large additions by the author, was published at Oxford in 1761. Besides the works already mentioned, Gibson published a number of Sermons, and other works of a religious and devotional kind. The Vita Thomae Bodleii with the Historia Bibliothecae Bodleianae in the Catalogi librorum manuscriptorum (Oxford, 1697), and the Reliquiae Spelmannianae (Oxford, 1698), are also from his pen.

External links
 Papers and correspondence

References

1669 births
1748 deaths
People from Eden District
Deans of the Chapel Royal
18th-century Church of England bishops
Alumni of The Queen's College, Oxford
Bishops of Lincoln
Bishops of London
Chancellors of the College of William & Mary
Members of the Privy Council of Great Britain
Burials at All Saints Church, Fulham
1660s births
People from Westmorland
17th-century Anglican theologians
18th-century Anglican theologians